Elmer Smith (September 15, 1907 – 1987) was an American football, basketball, and baseball player and coach. Smith served as the head basketball coach Centenary College in Shreveport, Louisiana from 1939 to 1942 before taking on the head football coaching duties at Southern Arkansas University in Magnolia, Arkansas from 1946 to 1953. After leaving Southern Arkansas, he was an assistant football coach at Texas A&M University under coaches Bear Bryant, Jim Myers, Hank Foldberg, and Gene Stallings.

Smith was born on September 15, 1907, in Casa, Arkansas, and graduated from Danville High School in Danville, Arkansas. He was a multi-sport athlete at Hendrix College in Conway, Arkansas, lettering in football, basketball, baseball, and track and field, before graduating in 1931 with a bachelor's degree in economics. He earned a master's degree in physical education from Peabody College. Smith began his coaching career in 1931 at Hamburg High School in Hamburg, Arkansas, where he led the football team in a record of 18–2 in two seasons. He then returned to Hendrix as an assistant coach. Smith was hired at Centenary as an assistant coach in 1936, succeeding Elza Renfro. He remained at Centenary until 1942, when joined the United States Navy, reaching the rank of lieutenant commander.

Head coaching record

College football

References

External links
 

1907 births
1987 deaths
American football fullbacks
Baseball catchers
Centenary Gentlemen basketball coaches
Centenary Gentlemen football coaches
Hendrix Warriors baseball players
Hendrix Warriors football coaches
Hendrix Warriors football players
Hendrix Warriors men's basketball players
New Orleans Pelicans (baseball) players
Southern Arkansas Muleriders football coaches
Texas A&M Aggies football coaches
College men's track and field athletes in the United States
High school football coaches in Arkansas
United States Navy officers
United States Navy personnel of World War II
Peabody College alumni
People from Danville, Arkansas
People from Perry County, Arkansas
Coaches of American football from Arkansas
Players of American football from Arkansas
Baseball players from Arkansas
Basketball coaches from Arkansas
Basketball players from Arkansas
Track and field athletes from Arkansas